Mulliyawalai or Mulliyavalai is a town in the Mullaitivu District, Sri Lanka. Vidyananda College is located in this town. Mulliyawalai is one of the important commercial center in Mullaitivu.

Education 
Mulliyawalai is well known place in Mullaitivu District for best education and well educated people. There is well know National School for famous in education which established by C.Sundaralingam he was a Ceylon Tamil academic, politician, Member of Parliament and government minister.

Schools 
Schools in Mulliyawalai area.

 Mu/Mulliyawalai Tamil Vidyalayam
 Mu/Kalaimahal Vidyalayam
 Vidyananda College (Mu/Vidyananda College-National School)
 Mu/Thanneeruttu Hindu Board Tamil Mixed School
 THANNIROOTTU .C.C.T.M.S
M/Thanneeroottu Muslim Maha Viddiyalayam (மு/தண்ணீருற்று முஸ்லிம் மகா வித்தியாலம்,முள்ளியவளை)
 Mu/Mulliyavalai RCTMS

Religion 
Mulliyawalai area has long history for religious places and norms with historical places. There are number of famous and ancient temples and historical places.

Temples 
 Kattavinayagar Temple
 Kalyanavelavar Alayam
 Santhiamman Temple || சந்தியம்மன் கோவில்
 Uttankarai Sithi Vinayagar Temple (ஊற்றங்கரை சித்தி விநாயகர் ஆலயம்)
 St. Matthias' Church
 Mamoolai Krishna Temple
 Shree Chithra Velayuthar Temple
 கணுக்கேணி கற்பகப் பிள்ளையார் ஆலயம்
 Mulliyawalai Church (முள்ளியவளை தேவாலயம்)
 Jumma Mosque
 Tanniyuttu Grand Jumma Mosque
 Puthanvayal Nagathampiran Alayam
 Iyanar Kovil Mulliyawalai
 Mamoolai St.Antony's church
 Sai Ashramam Mulliyawalai
 Mizpah Prayer Missionary Ministry Mulliyawalai
 Narasingar Kovil Mulliyawalai

Towns in Mullaitivu District
Maritimepattu DS Division